Pterostylis taurus, commonly known as the little bull orchid, is a species of orchid endemic to Queensland. It has a rosette of leaves at the base and a single dark red to reddish brown and white flower that leans downwards.

Description
Flowering occurs between May and July.

Taxonomy and naming
Pterostylis taurus was first described in 1989 by David Jones and Mark Clements and the description was published in Australian Orchid Research. The specific epithet (taurus) is a Latin word meaning "bull".

Distribution and habitat
The little bull orchid grows in coastal scrub and forest between Paluma and the Mount Windsor National Park west of Daintree.

References

taurus
Endemic orchids of Australia
Orchids of Queensland
Plants described in 1989